A threat is an act of coercion.

Threat may also refer to:

Common uses
 Threat (computer), a possible danger that might exploit a vulnerability to breach security
 Intimidation
 Threat display, a behaviour aiming at intimidation of a potential enemy
 Threat of force (public international law), an act of coercion between nations

Arts, entertainment, and media

Films
 Threat (film), a 2006 American film by Matt Pizzolo
 The Threat (1949 film), a 1949 American film noir directed by Felix E. Feist
 The Threat (1960 film), a 1960 American crime film

Literature
 The Threat (memoir), a 2019 memoir by Andrew McCabe
 The Threat (novel), a 1998 novel by K.A. Applegate

Other uses in arts, entertainment, and media
 "The Threat" (Dynasty), an episode of the TV series Dynasty

See also
 Threatin, an American rock band accused of being fake and a vanity project
 Triple threat (disambiguation)